Fagonia pachyacantha is a species of flowering plant in the caltrop family known by the common name sticky fagonbush. It is native to the Sonoran Desert of northwest Mexico in Sonora and the Lower Colorado River Valley area at the California and Arizona border.

Description
Each leaf is divided into three flat, green leaflets and there are straight, pointed, spine-like stipules at the base of each set.

Flowers, each about 1.5 centimeters wide, appear in the axils of the sparse leaves. The flower has five purplish pink petals with bases narrowed to thin claws. The fruit is a rounded capsule about half a centimeter long.

References

External links
Jepson Manual Treatment — Fagonia pachyacantha
Fagonia pachyacantha — U.C. Photo gallery

pachyacantha
Flora of the Sonoran Deserts
Flora of the California desert regions
Flora of Sonora
Flora of Arizona
Natural history of the Colorado Desert
Natural history of the Lower Colorado River Valley
Flora without expected TNC conservation status